Savner Assembly constituency is one of twelve constituencies of the Maharashtra Vidhan Sabha located in the Nagpur district.

It is a part of the Ramtek (Lok Sabha constituency) (SC) from Nagpur district along with five other assembly constituencies, viz. Katol, Hingna, Umred (SC), Kamthi and Ramtek Assembly constituency.

Members of Legislative Assembly

See also
Savner
Kalameshwar

References

Assembly constituencies of Nagpur district
Assembly constituencies of Maharashtra